"Babel" is a song performed by British folk rock band Mumford & Sons, released as the fourth single from their second studio album Babel (2012). It was released on 9 July 2013 as a digital download. The song was written by Mumford & Sons and produced by Markus Dravs.

Music video
A music video to accompany the release of "Babel" was first released onto YouTube on 8 July 2013 at a total length of four minutes and five seconds. The video shows the band performing the song in the former 16th Street station in Oakland, California.

Track listing

Charts and certifications

Weekly charts

Year-end charts

Certifications

Release history

References

2012 songs
2013 singles
Mumford & Sons songs
Island Records singles
Song recordings produced by Markus Dravs
Songs written by Marcus Mumford
Songs written by Ted Dwane
Songs written by Winston Marshall
Songs written by Ben Lovett (British musician)